Papyrus 36 (in the Gregory-Aland numbering), designated by siglum 𝔓36, is a copy of the New Testament in Greek. It is a papyrus manuscript of the Gospel of John, it contains only John 3:14-18.31-32.34-35. The manuscript palaeographically has been assigned to the 6th century.

The Greek text of this codex is an eclectic. Aland placed it in Category III.

The manuscript was examined by Pistelli, Carlini, and Horseley.

It is currently housed at the Laurentian Library (PSI 3) in Florence.

See also 

 List of New Testament papyri
 Papyrus 35

References

Further reading 

 E. Pistelli, Papiri greci e latini della Società Italiana I (Florence 1912), pp. 5–6. 
 A. Carlini, Riesame di due frammenti fiorentini del vangelo di Giovanni, AP 22/23 (1974), pp. 219–222. 
 A. Carlini, Papiri litterari greci 28 (Pisa, 1978), pp. 193–199. 
 G. H. R. Horsley, Scribal Carelessness in P36?, in: New Documents Illustrating Early Christianity, 3 (Macquarie University, 1983), pp. 100–101.

New Testament papyri
6th-century biblical manuscripts
Gospel of John papyri